Eophyllophila is a genus of flies in the family Tachinidae.

Species
Eophyllophila africana Villeneuve, 1935
Eophyllophila elegans Townsend, 1926
Eophyllophila includens (Walker, 1859)

References

Diptera of Asia
Diptera of Africa
Exoristinae
Tachinidae genera
Taxa named by Charles Henry Tyler Townsend